When material is removed to create a woodworking joint, the resulting surfaces have the following names:
 Cheek, the flat surface parallel to the face of the joint member which exposes long grain
 Shoulder, the surface perpendicular to the face or edge of the joint member which exposes end grain

See also 
 Carpentry 
 Woodworking

References

Joinery